Armand Bissen (11 January 1931 – 26 May 2021) was a Luxembourgian footballer. He played in five matches for the Luxembourg national football team from 1952 to 1955. He was also part of Luxembourg's squad for the football tournament at the 1952 Summer Olympics, but he did not play in any matches.

References

External links
 
 

1931 births
2021 deaths
Luxembourgian footballers
Luxembourg international footballers
Place of birth missing
Association football defenders
Stade Dudelange players